The 2008 Maplin UK Championship was a professional ranking snooker tournament that took place between 13 and 21 December 2008 at the Telford International Centre in Telford, England. It was the 32nd edition of the event.

World Snooker, the sports governing body, opened an investigation into allegations of match fixing, after Stephen Maguire beat Jamie Burnett 9–3 in the first round. Several bookmakers had stopped taking bets on the match before it even started, when reports of a number of large sums having been placed on the same correct score began to circulate within the industry. Just prior to the 2009 World Championship, where Maguire and Burnett were drawn together the first round, it was announced that Strathclyde Police had opened an official enquiry into the match. The enquiry was closed in 2011 with no criminal charges against either of them, and a World Snooker disciplinary enquiry was announced, which ended without any regulatory action. In September 2013 it was announced, that Stephen Lee was found guilty of agreeing to lose the first frame of his first and second round matches.

Shaun Murphy won the title with a 10–9 victory over Marco Fu.

Prize fund
The breakdown of prize money for this year is shown below:

Winner: £100,000
Runner-up: £46,000
Semi-final: £23,250
Quarter-final: £16,450
Last 16: £12,050
Last 32: £8,750
Last 48: £5,500
Last 64: £2,300

Stage one highest break: £500
Stage two highest break: £5,000
Stage one maximum break: £1,000
Stage two maximum break: £25,000
Total: £625,000

Main draw

Final

Qualifying

The qualifying took place from December 1 to 8 at the English Institute of Sport in Sheffield, England.

Century breaks

Televised stage centuries

147, 130, 100  Ding Junhui
143, 127, 117, 114, 110  Ronnie O'Sullivan
139, 105, 103, 100  Mark Selby
138, 136, 118, 116, 106, 104, 102, 101  Marco Fu
136, 120, 109  Stephen Lee
136, 115  Shaun Murphy
136  Mark Williams
132  Ali Carter
131, 108, 102  Rory McLeod
127, 103  Peter Ebdon

127  Ken Doherty
122, 115, 112, 104  Stephen Maguire
120  Graeme Dott
119, 100, 100  Mark Allen
118  Neil Robertson
113  Jamie Burnett
109, 100  John Higgins
105  Joe Perry
102  Joe Swail
100  Matthew Stevens

Qualifying stage centuries

143  Matthew Selt
141  Ricky Walden
137  Chris McBreen
134, 105  Joe Swail
134  Jimmy White
129, 114  Alan McManus
126  Mike Dunn
123, 106  Paul Davison
122, 101  Liu Chuang
119, 116, 109  Ian McCulloch
118, 107  Ian Preece
116, 111, 106, 104  Judd Trump
116, 108, 105  Stuart Pettman
115  Rodney Goggins
115  Joe Delaney
114, 104, 104  Lee Spick
113  Atthasit Mahitthi
112, 102  Jamie Jones

111, 109  Rory McLeod
111, 101  Mark Davis
108, 102 Tom Ford
106, 105  Matthew Couch
106, 102  Michael Holt
104, 101  Robert Milkins
104  Barry Pinches
104  Jin Long
101  Patrick Wallace
101  Kuldesh Johal
101  Jamie Burnett
101  Matthew Stevens
100  Steve Davis

Notes

References

UK Championship (snooker)
UK Championship
UK Championship
UK Championship